Crash Test Aglaé is a French comedy road movie directed and written by Éric Gravel.

Plot
Aglaé (India Hair) is a rigidly work-obsessed young crash test technician with obsessive-compulsive disorder whose whole world is her work, apart from her adoration of the game of cricket. But then the French factory where she works is closed because the work can be done cheaper in India. Aglaé and two colleagues – Liette (Julie Depardieu) and  Marcelle (Yolande Moreau) – decide to accept the company's not-very-serious offer of relocation, and set out from rural France for India in Marcelle's dreadful old jalopy, a quirky journey that ends up as an unlikely personal voyage.

Cast
 India Hair as Aglaé Lanctot
 Julie Depardieu as Liette
 Yolande Moreau as Marcelle
 Anne Charrier as The HRD
 Frédérique Bel as Lola
 Tristán Ulloa as Clovis
 Adil Hussain as Shankar
 Hanns Zischler as Friedrich Fürstenberg

Production
The movie is shot in Conflans-Sainte-Honorine, Île-de-France, Lorraine, Poland, Kazakhstan and India. Shooting started on 4 September 2015 and ended on 25 November 2015.

References

External links
 

2010s drama road movies
French drama road movies
2010s French-language films
2017 drama films
2010s French films